Kaine Parker is a character appearing in American comic books published by Marvel Comics. The character has been depicted as a superhero and former supervillain who serves as an ally, an enemy, and foil to Peter Parker / Spider-Man and Ben Reilly. Created by Terry Kavanagh and Steven Butler, the character first appeared in Web of Spider-Man #119 (December 1994) as the Jackal's first failed attempt of a clone of Spider-Man. He later appeared as the new Scarlet Spider in the Marvel Point One one-shot in November 2011 before starring in his own series.

Kaine Parker / Scarlet Spider will make his cinematic debut in the 2023 feature film Spider-Man: Across the Spider-Verse.

Fictional character biography

Kaine's debut

Kaine is the Jackal's first temporary success to clone Peter Parker but the flawed cloning process is left deformed and mentally unstable. Kaine is later identified by the Jackal as "Parker 3.0"; the implications of this are unknown. The Jackal discards Kaine because the clone starts showing early signs of the degeneration process, and Kaine experiences a strong feeling of rejection similar to that between a father and son. Kaine realizes the partial degeneration also caused a slight amplification of the powers he "inherited" from Peter. Not only has his strength, speed, and agility been copied from the original Peter's, but he gains a "precognitive sense" that shows him flashes of the future (an amplified version of Peter's spider-sense). He also possesses a "Mark of Kaine", a burning touch that he uses to leave eaten away hand prints on his victims' faces. Though never explicitly stated within the story, in a later interview former Spider-Man editor/writer Glenn Greenberg revealed that the Mark of Kaine was meant to be another analog of one of Spider-Man's powers, namely the ability to cling to walls.

The Jackal goes on to create a new, better clone which would be known as Ben Reilly. When the Jackal uses Reilly against Peter, the ensuing battle leaves Reilly and the Jackal for dead. They both manage to survive; the Jackal places himself into suspended animation in a cloning pod to awaken later; and Reilly leaves New York.

Behind the scenes, Norman Osborn manages to have the files on Ben and Peter switched, so the Jackal would think Peter is the clone and Ben is the real deal. Consulting the Jackal's files, Kaine also believes the same, so he follows Ben through his "exile". For a time, he finds love in the arms of police detective Louise Kennedy of Salt Lake City, until he discovers she is working for the criminals. This revelation, coupled with Kaine's increased cellular degeneration, pushes Kaine even further towards insanity and he kills Louise. Kaine continues to stalk Ben, making it appear as though Janine Godbe, Ben's new love, has committed suicide. Kaine, hoping to give the man who he thinks is the clone (Peter) the life he could never have, frames Ben for a number of murders he commits since both men have the same fingerprints.

Later flashback scenes reveal that Kaine worked as a bounty hunter for a time, being briefly dispatched to eliminate Kraven the Hunter. Kaine also experienced a 'vision' via his enhanced spider-sense that Kraven would kill him in the future. Despite the two engaging in a brutal confrontation — Kraven even briefly mistook Kaine for Spider-Man due to a vague recognition of Spider-Man's template in Kaine — both survive despite Kaine burying Kraven alive. Kraven dug himself out after three days, but his friend and manservant was killed by Kaine during the fight.

Trial of Peter Parker
Peter Parker is eventually tried and convicted for Kaine's crimes because they have the same fingerprints. Although Peter goes to prison for some time, Ben Reilly arranges to take his place in prison.

Kaine wanders New York, defeating and executing scores of Spider-Man's enemies, including the Grim Hunter and Doctor Octopus (although both would later be resurrected). They grow fearful of him and form coalitions to protect themselves proactively—including the short-lived 'Sinister Seven'—but meet with little success.

Peter wants Kaine to stand for what he has done, but Kaine initially refuses. The two fight and end up getting dragged into a mock-trial where Spider-Man is on trial, Kaine is his defense attorney, Carnage is the prosecutor, several Ravencroft inmates are the jury, and a powerful being known as Judas Traveller is the judge. During the one-sided trial, Kaine tries to physically fight off all those who are against Spider-Man before Traveller returns them to their previous place of battle, declaring the proof of a lost soul such as Kaine willing to defend Spider-Man is proof of his innocence.

After an incident involving a superpowered villainess named Stunner, a weakened Kaine still refuses to confess to his crimes. Spider-Man responds by knocking Kaine out and webbing him up before heading to the courthouse. Kaine reawakens before they arrive and struggles again with Spider-Man in refusing to confess. At this point, Kaine admits that he has done everything to protect Peter's life and reveals that he is the first clone of Peter, now partially degenerated. Spider-Man decides that if Kaine will not reveal the truth, then he will reveal his true identity to the entire courtroom and end everything. Kaine pleads for Peter not to do this and eventually gives into revealing the real truth about the murders and the "Mark of Kaine".

Maximum Clonage
After Peter Parker gives in to the news of being a clone and Ben Reilly is the true individual, he allies himself with the Jackal. Kaine refuses to let him throw his life away. He confronts the Jackal with the full intent of destroying him, when the Jackal manipulates his mind once more by leading Kaine to believe he will be cured of the degeneration process. Once Jackal reveals he has lied again, Kaine leaves feeling dejected. He goes back to Mary Jane Watson for answers, and after a conversation of power and responsibility, Kaine returns to the Jackal's lab in time to assist Ben in a battle against numerous Spider-clones. In the ensuing battle, Spidercide impales him with a spike taken from nearby machinery, seriously injuring and possibly killing him. The Jackal showed a moment of fatherly concern for Kaine, asking why after everything, Kaine would save him. Kaine dies telling Jackal 'You gave me life' and Jackal lets go of him indifferently, calling him "pathetic" and a waste of bad chemicals for saving his life over such a simple reason, but then eyes a regeneration pod, and remarks "but even bad chemicals can be put to good use".

Redemption
During Ben Reilly's time as Spider-Man, some of the world's strongest fighters are pitted against one another in a fighting competition called the Great Game, a fighting tournament in which wealthy people wager on the fighters for their amusement.

One of the Game's main sponsors, James Johnsmeyer, finds the pod containing the revived Kaine, and decides to initiate him into the competition, sending the Rhino to fight him. After Kaine's refusal and escape, thanks to temporary partner Shannon, Johnsmeyer still attempts to involve Kaine by allowing other Game competitors to attack him (Joystick and Polestar). Spider-Man interferes in the skirmish and gets sidetracked by Joystick and Polestar while Kaine puts a near-fatal beating on Rhino and escapes with Shannon. Before they are able to get away, Spider-Man manages to tag Shannon with a tracer and he pursues them once Polestar and Rhino are taken into custody.

He finds them moments before the police, but after an incident that threatened to kill the officers, Kaine and Shannon escape again. This time, Kaine's destination is Johnsmeyer's headquarters. Spider-Man finds them once again after Kaine manages to single-handedly destroy all of Johnsmeyer's rooftop security defenses, but once inside, Johnsmeyer reveals that Shannon — who was still working for Johnsmeyer during the entire ordeal — has been manipulating and deceiving Kaine. Kaine, not wanting to become a puppet of anyone ever again, tries to kill Shannon but was persuaded by Spider-Man not to do so. Kaine leaves and vows to take down every sponsor of the Great Game.

During a later encounter with Reilly, in which Janine Godbe returns to the man she loved, Kaine finally brings himself to let go of his hatred for his brother, even saving Ben's life after nearly leaving him to die in a burning diner. Encouraged by his brother's example (as well as finally acknowledging Ben as his brother rather than his foe), Kaine hands himself over to the law, as Janine (who was wanted for the murder of her abusive father) does the same, both accepting that they have to face their pasts to find any peace with themselves.

At that point, it is revealed that his degeneration is killing him, and Kaine is incarcerated in some type of hospital-prison with other killers. Initially lamenting his situation and accepting his imminent death, Kaine resolves to fight after seeing hallucinations of Ben, the Jackal, Louise, himself, and Peter Parker.

Several months later, he is shown escaping from jail alongside many other superpowered criminals in an issue of Thunderbolts. Kaine breaks out to try to stop Norman Osborn after finding out that he is still alive, has masterminded the Clone Saga, and killed his brother Ben. Kaine is seen tracking down and attacking Osborn's agents in southern Europe, leaving behind his signature "Mark". The incident is mentioned by one of Osborn's men, saying that there had been "difficulties with the one called Kaine, but we were able to persevere".

Return
Kaine later appears in New York City, attacking Spider-Man as he tried to track down Raptor. He reveals that he has sought Raptor out, hoping that he could cure his cellular degeneration, and attacks Spider-Man to keep him from the villain. He also seems to hold some enmity towards Peter, perhaps after finding out he is the actual original Spider-Man. He also is one of the few people to have remembered Peter's secret identity after the worldwide mindwipe of this knowledge by Mephisto (Peter noting that he should have expected his clone to remember his true identity if anyone would).

When Raptor attacks Harry Osborn and Peter's cousins at Aunt May's house, Kaine appears, having been working with Raptor the whole time. He exposes Peter's identity as Spider-Man and states that Peter is a clone of Reilly and should be killed since he is the closest thing to Ben. Peter beats Raptor unconscious and escapes. It is later shown that Raptor lied to Kaine about being able to cure his degeneration to gain an ally in his quest for revenge. Furious, Kaine started to choke Raptor, seemingly killing him.

Grim Hunt
Kaine is next seen being hunted by Ana Kravinoff and Alyosha Kravinoff. Their next attempt to hunt Kaine succeeds in brutally beating him; he barely escapes with his life, the Kravinoffs mocking that he will be "The only spider left. Even if you are an ugly one". Kaine manages to get to Peter's apartment to warn Peter that they, the "spiders", are being hunted before he falls unconscious. Later that night, after shaving his beard and cutting his hair, Kaine aids Spider-Man, Arachne, and Anya Corazon against the Kraven clan. After the Kravens abduct Araña and Arachne, Kaine tells Peter to 'run. Run and screw the rest'. Disgusted at Kaine's selfishness even when the two of them share DNA and memory, Spider-Man bluntly informs Kaine that the difference between them is the fact that he does not use his life's misery as an excuse to give up the good fight. After Spider-Man is laying, defeated, in an open grave with the Kravens advancing, Kaine knocks him unconscious, puts on his costume, and fights the Kravens in his place. He is mauled, stabbed, and ultimately sacrificed to bring Kraven the Hunter back from the dead, thus achieving redemption with his last acts to save his 'brother'. The Kravens do not realize they have killed the wrong 'spider' until later that night when Kraven recognizes the scent of Kaine, and they unmask the dead Spider-Man. As a result of this, Kraven is now undead and can only be killed by the original Spider-Man.

After the battle with the Kravinoffs, Kaine is buried under the "Kaine Parker" name.  His body does not decompose to ash or goo, as the case with the Jackal's other cloning efforts.

However, in the epilogue of Grim Hunt Kaine is shown climbing out of his own grave with mutated features, including extra eyes in a spider-like pattern on his forehead, with the narrative box saying 'Rise, cursed one. Rise... Tarantula'. This is later shown to have been spoken by The Jackal, who was present at Kaine's resurrection.

Spider-Island
During the Spider Island storyline, Kaine is further mutated by the Jackal into "Tarantula", a hulking Man-Spider creature: a man's body, with a spider head, covered head to toe in spider hair, with 4 spider legs projecting from his back.

As Tarantula, he is put under Adriana Soria's control, acting as a personal bodyguard and henchman to the Jackal. Knowing about the genetic relationship between Kaine and Peter, Soria sends Kaine to Horizon Labs, to tamper with a cure being developed there for the "Spider-Virus". This culminates in a battle with Peter (made aware of the recent access to a private fingerprint locked lab), after which he is forcefully submerged in the pool of highly concentrated cure. Kaine re-emerges, his mind-link with Soria broken, and a fully healed clone. Despite the serum somehow curing him of every trace of his former degeneration, including his heavily scarred skin, Kaine claims to have retained his powers and abilities. In the final chapter, Kaine, now fully cured and seemingly a perfect clone in every way Ben Reilly was, helps take down the Spider Queen. Kaine and Peter grab costumes from Peter's lab, Kaine opting for the sonic-shield "Big Time" outfit as the two head off. While Peter goes to the Empire State Building with Mary Jane to cure New York, Kaine stays behind with the Avengers to fight the Spider Queen. As Peter weakens the Spider Queen, Kaine and Ms. Marvel attempt a move that Ms. Marvel had originally perfected with Spider-Man, swinging Kaine by a web and launches him at the Spider Queen. Kaine turns on his sonic-shield to protect himself from the Spider Queen's sonic scream as stingers (like Peter's from The Other arc) erupt from his arms and he goes through Spider Queen's throat, delivering the killing blow. The Other powers were confirmed in a conversation between Peter and Kaine, which Kaine said that "he died and came back with all these new powers" that Peter confirmed he had been there and done that. After the battle, Kaine evades the other heroes during the aftermath of the battle using the suit, but Madame Web is able to 'see' him regardless, and talks to him about his future. Kaine meets up with Peter at the airport where he is seeing off Aunt May, unmasked and free of his former degeneration only looking slightly more disheveled and taller, much like Ben Reilly was in the Lost Years arc. Kaine informs Peter he is leaving New York, and that he is keeping the stealth suit due to Madame Web's advice.

Scarlet Spider solo series

It was revealed in the Marvel Point One one shot that Kaine is the new Scarlet Spider in his own ongoing series. This was confirmed by editor Stephen Wacker in the "Letters to the Editor" page of The Amazing Spider-Man #673.

Having been cured of his mutation, but not his spider-powers, he takes up the Scarlet Spider mantle, and moves to Houston, Texas. Although planning to simply pass through the city and move on to Mexico, he was distracted when he discovered a human trafficking ring while attempting to steal money from criminals. Kaine managed to save the only girl still alive in a shipping container that had been used to smuggle her group into America. Kaine subsequently abandoned his plans to leave the city when the hospital where he left the victim was attacked by a fire-manipulating assassin who intended to kill the girl: Aracely. The policeman and the doctor who attended her case inspired Kaine to remain in Houston to help them face the city problems as its only superhero and to take Aracely with him, reasoning that if she were to stay under their case, she would be eventually deported and then be easy prey for whoever sent the super-powered assassin after her. But as vigilante, Kaine was not honor-bound to follow the law in that regard. However, after he is attacked by the Assassin's Guild—following a past incident where he killed on their territory without permission—Kaine is forced to make a deal with Bella Donna, where he agrees to perform one assassination for her in the future in return for her leaving him and his new friends alone.

Without his Scarlet Spider outfit, Kaine finds himself face-to-face with Ana Kravinoff, who tries to kill Kaine before informing him that her father Kraven the Hunter is coming for him and there is nothing he can do. Madame Web's vision at the end of the issue confirms that dark times are coming for Kaine as the Kravens plan their next move. Later, he gets involved with Roxxon Energy Corporation after the daughter of the CEO blows up the top floor of Roxxon's office building with a missile. In his investigation of the events, he storms the CEO's offices and ends up fighting the hero team Rangers. He later allies with them when they discover that Roxxon had accidentally released an energy being from the ground in one of their oil platforms; to contain it, the company had acquired the services of human smugglers (the Lobo Cartel) to feed the beast with human sacrifices.

At one point, Kaine helps Agent Venom fight and defeat Carnage.

To both avenge a Japanese girl who was murdered by her captors and the criminals behind the treatment of Aracely, Kaine investigates and attempts his best to stop human smuggling operations running through Houston. Shortly after, Aracely starts to manifest weird dreams concerning the Sixth Creation, Aztlan, her missing parents, gods, a talking coyote and the Rise of Mictlan. Taking a stroll through the park to discuss this strange change, she and Kaine are attacked by the Lobo - drug crime leaders, the human smugglers behind Aracely's abduction and werewolves sent with the intent of killing her by the mysterious Mr. Moctezuma so "the Sixth Creation could begin". During the fight Aracely escapes but Kaine is beaten and eventually killed. However, in death he encounters Ero, from "The Other" story arc, who states she can return him to life only if he embraces the other. Kaine at first rejects Ero but realizes that Aracely still needs his help, so he agrees. In the real world, Kaine bursts out of a web cocoon, reborn not as before, but as a monstrous spider-creature. The spider-creature Kaine maims one of the two werewolves, forcing them to flee. He then attacks Aracely until she is able to use her mental powers to bring him back. Kaine breaks out of the husk of the spider-creature completely healed of all scars but still carrying the Other inside him. It is then that Aracely proclaims him as her "champion", a title that is not merely affective but also has a deeper meaning as hinted by her father's words and the strange portents with cryptic Aztec mythic symbolism in her dreams.

When Kaine is forced to see a rodeo by Aracely, Wally, and Donald he fights a drunken Armadillo who is trying to reconnect with his ex-girlfriend. When Kaine sees Armadillo's ex-girlfriend accept him back despite being a monster he realizes he can have somebody in his life and he later kisses Annabelle. Unknown to Kaine, Sergei Kravinoff and Ana Kravinoff watched him fight Armadillo and Annabelle had destroyed a letter from Julia Carpenter warning him to leave Houston.

After settling debts with the Assassins Guild and encountering the Superior Spider-Man, Kaine's scars returned. This was however a trick by Kraven the Hunter who had drugged Kaine so he had hallucinate the scars' return as well as for a brief time seeing Kraven as Ben Reilly. After Kaine worked out he was being played he fought the hallucination, eventually seeing Kraven's face in a replica of Ben Reilly's costume. Kaine prepared to fight again unaware that Kraven and his daughter Ana had kidnapped Aracely, Annabelle and all his friends. As his fight with Kravinoffs went on, it turned out Kraven wanted to settle the score with Kaine because Kaine's blood was used to resurrect Kraven and by using his blood Kraven was cursed into un-life and wanted to fight Kaine to the death, using his friends as a leverage should he refuse: Kaine's friend Donald is disemboweled when this happens. Kaine kills then revives Kraven as a punishment, and then Kraven escapes with his daughter. Donald is then placed in intensive care, but the guilt threatens to overcome Kaine.

After saving his friends once more when his hotel room is destroyed by the daughter of Roxxon's CEO with a rocket-propelled grenade while they were in the middle of an attack by the mystic entity Shathra and an arrest attempt by Wally (who is angry at him for Donald's condition), Kaine is forced to use the form of the Other once more in front of them, scaring away Annabelle. Overwhelmed by all these events occurring at the same time and his guilt, Kaine stops trying to be a hero in Houston and decides to go to Mexico with Aracely to help her find if her parents are alive and the truth of every mystery regarding her they have come across.

New Warriors

Kaine along with Hummingbird joins the New Warriors.

Spider-Verse
During the Spider-Verse storyline, Kaine was with the New Warriors in Eastern Europe when they were attacked by Daemos of the Inheritors. A family of Spider-Totem hunters, the Inheritors were tightening their noose on the spiders across the multi-verse, including Kaine, despite him being a clone of Peter Parker and the receptacle of "the Other". After Daemos defeated the New Warriors, Kaine attempted to impale him through the chest with spikes coming from his arm, as "the Other" Spider-monster within was inclined to takeover. Daemos realized that, unlike other spiders, Kaine's arsenal makes him feel pain. As Daemos realizes that Kaine is the current receptacle of the Other, believing he could savour the spider-essence within Kaine for days, he is suddenly by the group of other Spiders including Old Man Spider-Man, Spider-Man of Earth-70105, and Spider-Woman of Earth-65. Kaine is skeptical at first, believing these are clones (Parkers and Stacys) sent by his father, the Jackal. Suddenly, this version of Ben Reilly (the original Scarlet Spider) informs Kaine that they are other versions from across the multi-verse, which surprised Kaine, as his brother Ben Reilly of the 616 Universe was murdered by Green Goblin. Daemos then breaks Spider-Man of Earth-70105's spine and Kaine escapes with the into a portal to Earth-13, which was the Safe Zone.

At the Safe Zone, the pheromones of Kaine's Spider-Essence (from the Other) are recognized by Silk. After collaborating with the other spiders, it becomes clear that the Inheritors have mastered cloning technology, as they regenerate with the same memories into new cloned bodies (explaining Morlun twice returning after turning to dust, as most clones do). As Black Widow of Earth 1610 (Ultimate Peter Parker's female clone), Ben Reilly, and Kaine are all clones, they head the mission to Jennix's realm to infiltrate his cloning facility in the Baxter Building. After disabling that reality's Johnny Storm and Tony Stark, the clones then attempt to take on Jennix in the cloning facility. After Kaine killed Jennix with spikes coming from within, Jennix regenerated in the cloning caskets. After realizing that the top of the Baxter Building was the receiver that transferred the consciousness of deceased Inheritors into newly cloned bodies, Ben Reilly sacrificed himself to remove the Inheritors' safety net. After losing Ben Reilly a second time, Kaine began to feel the Other emerging and took off to Loomworld to face the Inheritors alone. While coming face-to-face with the Inheritors, Kaine had spikes emerge from his body and he killed Solus, the Patriarch of the Inheritors. In retaliation, Morlun killed Kaine in his "Other form" by ripping off one of his spider arms and impaling him in the skull. As the Inheritors require the Bride (Silk), the Scion (Benjy Parker from MC2/Earth 982) and the Other, which was Kaine, for the ceremony, Kaine's body was required for his blood to be used in the coming ritual.

After the other spiders defeat the Inheritors and imprison them in the bunker within Earth-3145, Karn was revealed to be a future Master Weaver. After past Karn takes his place as the Master Weaver and sends all the spiders to their home realities except for Spider-UK and Spider-Girl (who become the Warriors of the Great Web), a human hand bursts out of the Other's deceased husk, revealing that Kaine is still alive.

Dead No More: The Clone Conspiracy
Kaine returns in the Dead No More: The Clone Conspiracy storyline, where he and Spider-Gwen attempt to help Peter escape New U Technologies. Prior to that, it was revealed that Kaine's human body emerged from the Other's corpse similar to Peter's in the "Changes" storyline and is greeted by the Master Weaver, who soon realizes that Kaine no longer has the powers of the Other and is now dying from the carrion virus that's a side-effect of Warren's cloning process, and is not allowed to go back to his Earth to avoid anyone catching it. Karn shows Kaine a number of realities with zombie apocalypses caused by this disease, and Kaine decides to visit these realities to find a possible way to stop it as he would be immune to the attacks. He tries to keep himself hidden from Karn's Web Warriors while researching it, but is caught by Spider-Gwen assisting him in going to other worlds and trying to find research to stop the virus. Kaine discovers that all the downfalls of these realities was caused by Parker Industries teaming up with the New U to spread Warren's technology which made the diseases widespread. In one of the realities, they manage to steal research from Peter and Warren before battling that reality's Kaine that dies from the disease during their fight. They take the alternate Kaine's corpse to the Great Web to study it, learning that Kaine himself is not contagious. Karn reveals that the events Kaine encountered in the other realities is starting to happen in Kaine's own reality. Since it is in the early process and Peter has not formed a full partnership with Warren yet, they still have a chance to stop it from happening. Their plan is to infiltrate the New U and have Spider-Gwen replace the 616 Gwen Stacy to find out more about the area. While Spider-Gwen changes her looks, Kaine reveals to Karn that his research on his deceased counterpart led him to discover when he is going to die, and he has very limited time. He kept it a secret from Spider-Gwen to make sure saving the 616 reality is their top priority. Kaine and Gwen are now currently in a relationship 

After kidnapping the 616 Gwen, Kaine informs Anna Maria Marconi that if they do not stop The Jackal and Miles Warren, "Peter Parker is the man who destroys the world". Unfortunately, he ends up being captured by The Jackal to be experimented on by him. However, due to Doctor Octopus' conflict with the Jackal for infecting Anna Maria with cloning cells and unintentionally activating kill switch that will kill all resurrected people and the clones' cloned body including Kaine and The Jackal, and the living human who has a clone cell like Maria without realizing it, Kaine is rescued by Spider-Woman of Earth-65. During the clone riots while combating The Jackal and most of Spider-Man's rogues in New U headquarters, Kaine soon realized that Ben Reilly is alive and he is now the Jackal before being throw by Ben off the building but was rescued again by Earth-65's Spider-Woman. As Spider-Man manage to deactivate and destroy the kill switch with help of his remaining allies, Kaine, along with most of the formerly deceased people and the clones manage to survive from the cloning degeneration. He reported to Peter that Prowler and DeWolfe had been trying their best to stop the riot before the virus dissolved and killed them once more. However, the New U's employer Dr. Clarkston reveals to Kaine and his allies that the recently-thought dead templates, the true Prowler/Hobie Brown and Jerry Salteres, were only comatose, being kept under the sub-basement and having their respective diseases cured as well. It is revealed thanks to the Webware's reversed signal, Kaine has been cured as well, leaving him with only mild facial scars. In the aftermath, detailed in Clone Conspiracy: Omega, Kaine bids farewell to Spider-Gwen, vowing to find Reilly and have him answer for his crimes.

Ben Reilly: The Scarlet Spider
Kaine makes good on this in the new 2017 series Ben Reilly: The Scarlet Spider where he confronts Ben Reilly upon tracking him to Las Vegas and they get into a fight. Ben convinces Kaine to stand down by arguing that he is genuinely trying to cure Abigail Mercury's terminal condition, but Kaine makes it clear to Ben that he will kill his "brother" for protecting the world if the girl dies and once Ben has saved her life. After Abigail Mercury because Ben tested a new drug on her too quickly, he is attacked by Kaine once again only for Kaine to be "killed" by what appears to be Marlo Chandler. The character that resembles Marlo Chandler then quickly identifies herself as actually being Death in disguise. She offers Ben the chance to restore Abigail Mercury or Kaine to life before she departs. When Ben asks her to save both of them and kill him instead, Death not only heals the other two, but also restores Ben to a healthy physical appearance, affirming that he has made a start on his efforts to redeem himself of his sins as the Jackal.

Spider-Geddon
During the "Spider-Geddon" storyline, Superior Octopus becomes Superior Spider-Man again and recruits Kaine to help fight the return of the Inheritors. Kaine informs them that he is not the "Other" anymore and suggests they call Ben Reilly as well, Superior Spider-Man states that they are using technology from the defunct New U Technologies to rebuild their cloning machine. Kaine sees Superior Spider-Man's point and leaves with him in a portal, unaware that Ben Reilly has followed them.

Kaine volunteers for a suicide mission to Earth-3145, where the Inheritors were trapped after the events of Spider-Verse. Kaine recruits Ashley Barton of Earth-807128 (that of Old Man Logan), who is not afraid to make sacrifices and take out the Inheritors, much like Kaine and Otto themselves, and unlike the other spiders. Kaine convinces Jessica Drew of Earth-616 to join the team, and deceives her, telling her the mission is actually a suicide mission to destroy the stone containing Solus' essence that could potentially leave them trapped to die on the radioactive Earth-3145. Lastly, they recruit "Charlie", a Peter Parker from Earth-218, who escaped the abuse of his Uncle Ben and does not believe in power or responsibility. Kaine plans to use Charlie as bait to lure Verna of the Inheritors.

On Earth-3145, they are confronted by John Jameson at Sims Tower, known as Astro-Spider, the second spider of that reality who received his powers from a radioactive spider that bit him in spacer. As they are submitted to Astro-Spider's psychic powers, all come to an understanding and take on Verna. After approaching Verna, Astro-Spider stabs her in the chest with the Solus Stone.

Verna heals from her wounds and absorbs the life force of Astro-Spider, killing him. Spider-Woman, taking the only working teleporter, leads a chase with Verna back to Earth, where Kaine, Ashley Barton, Jessica Drew and Charlie follow. As Verna learns she cannot absorb the life force of Jessica Drew due to her radioactive blood, Jessica plans to kill Verna. However, the Inheritor has one last trick up her sleeve, and she teleports Jessica right to Earth-616 and into the hands of Jennix. Meanwhile, Kaine attempting to sacrifice himself to Verna's hounds, plans to die on Earth-3145 as an ultimate sacrifice, enabling the escape of Ashley and Charlie. It appears that Spider-Force is left to die on Earth-3145, the radioactive earth.

It is revealed that Spider-Gwen and Peter Parker of 616 saved Kaine, Ashley and Charlie, recruiting them for the final battle against the Inheritors on Earth-616.

Powers and abilities

As Kaine
As an imperfect clone of Spider-Man, Kaine has superhuman strength, speed, agility, reflexes, and equilibrium all at higher levels than Spider-Man due to his continued mutation.

The true limit of his strength is unknown, but he has proven able to beat the Rhino unconscious and to hold his own against three Spider-Men at the same time (Peter Parker, Ben Reilly, and Spidercide). Kaine's durability is also superior to Spider-Man's, as he was able to withstand a massive explosion without any form of discomfort. He also tanked a full power blow from Spider-Man, without so much as flinching, as well as a bullet to the shoulder which barely slowed him down.

Kaine's spider-sense is even more stronger than Spider-Man's Spider-Sense. Kaine Parker can sense danger, see short glimpses of the future, and can sense venom unlike Spider-Man. Kaine also does not set off Parker or Reilly's spider-senses, but they do not set off his either.

Like Spider-Man his clinging ability is because of the Van der Waals force, but also left a distinctive scarring into surfaces (and people), which he calls the "Mark of Kaine". After defeating an enemy, usually resulting in death such as breaking their neck using his superhuman strength, he would burn the "Mark of Kaine" onto their face. Notable characters to have been defeated in such a fashion include Doctor Octopus (that was later resurrected). This ability also allows him to melt Spider-Man's webbing, and on at least one occasion he was able to use this 'talent' to cauterize a potentially fatal throat wound. Additionally, Kaine possesses a retractable bone spike on the underside of each forearm behind the wrist, which he calls the "Sting of Kaine", reminiscent of Wolverine's bone claws, though their exact composition is unknown.

Kaine also uses his ability to stick to walls in other ways. In one instance, he fashioned a weapon out of a large section of a building by simply sticking to the building and then pulling away with his superhuman strength, bringing a large chunk of it with him.

Due to flaws in his genetic make-up Kaine does not look like an ordinary human, his skin covered with a web-like mass of disfiguring scars. The costume that Kaine typically wears has been said to slow the degeneration process in his body. However it was recently suggested in Spider-Island: Deadly Foes that Kaine has a regeneration factor.

Being a clone of Spider-Man, Kaine is immune to the worldwide mind purging of Spider-Man's identity and retains this knowledge. However, Kaine was never implanted with Peter's memories and as a result of that lacks Peter's scientific knowledge.

As Tarantula
The extent of Kaine's powers in his Tarantula state are not fully known. Tarantula has four large spider legs that protrude from his back much like Spider-Man's Iron Spider costume. He retained all of the abilities he had as Kaine, with the addition of organic web shooters and presumably enhanced strength.

Following the loss of his Tarantula form during Spider-Island, his degeneration is currently reversed. Kaine now looks to be a perfect clone of Peter Parker (as Ben Reilly was), and while he cryptically claims to have retained his Spider-Powers, it was still unknown if he maintained them at the same power level prior to being resurrected as Tarantula. He also had a similar rebirth to Peter Parker was during the events of The Other, as Kaine is shown exhibiting forearm stingers and organic webbing near the end of the Spider-Island story.

As Scarlet Spider
In addition to possessing super-human levels of strength, speed, agility, durability, reflexes, Precognitive Spider Sense, and equilibrium, Kaine can also generate organic webbing from his wrists, similar to Spider-Man's web-shooters, is imbued with an accelerated healing factor, which helps him to recover from minor to fatal injuries and wounds in a much faster rate compared to a normal human, which usually takes days or weeks, depending on the nature of his injuries and has lost his scars to have a normal appearance. He has also been imbued with enhanced vision, which grants him the ability to see in the dark, as well as a form of psychic connection with arachnids and spiders. From his former powers, Kaine appears to still have the "Mark of Kaine", using the ability to burn off his beard and most of his hair, and retains the two retractable stingers, one on the inside of each wrist, which retains its lethality and can tear through flesh and plastic. Even without his spider-sense, Kaine has proven to be a formidable and ruthless hand-to-hand combatant, with many instances showing him take on several groups of opponents, such as gangsters, ninjas and superhumanly-powered enemies, usually winning such conflicts without sustaining much injuries or wounds. At one point, Kaine managed to take down the majority of the criminal gangs in the city of Houston within one night, without suffering any serious injuries or wounds, systematically and brutally targeting each one of the organisations at a time. This is partially attributed to his less polished and more brutal and violent fighting style, compared to Spider-Man's, who usually holds back from seriously wounding his opponents, which contrasts with Kaine's, who does not hold back his attacks while engaging in fights and is thus more likely to heavily maim or even kill his opponents, rather than simply incapacitating them.

After the events of Spider Island, Kaine retained the stealth suit, which Peter Parker created at Horizon Labs and used against the Spider-Queen. This gives Kaine invisibility to both visual and audio means, along with immunity to sonic-based attacks. However, Madame Web enhanced the suit to stay permanently red, helping perpetuate the Scarlet Spider alias around Houston.

Reception
 In 2020, CBR.com ranked the Kaine 8th in their "Marvel: Dark Spider-Man Villains, Ranked From Lamest To Coolest" list.

Other versions

MC2
In the alternate future known as MC2, Kaine successfully rescues baby May Parker from Norman Osborn and returns the girl to the parents (Peter Parker and Mary Jane Watson-Parker).

Later, Kaine allies himself with the Kingpin of Crime, but is betrayed by him during a confrontation with Daredevil. Daredevil sacrifices his own life to save Kaine. Kaine takes Daredevil's body to a regeneration chamber, where he is also attempting to assist Reilly Tyne (Ben Reilly's son) who is degenerating as a result of his imperfectly clone father's DNA. He attempts to summon the demon Zarathos to aid in saving the two, but, in the end, Zarathos turns on him and attempts to claim the boy's body as his human vessel. The soul of Daredevil fights the demon, and in the end Tyne is transformed into Darkdevil, with the soul of a hero and the powers of a demon.

Kaine attempts to kill the Kingpin but is stopped by Spider-Girl and sent to prison. There, he is recruited by Special Agent Arthur Whedon as part of a team of captured supervillains given the opportunity to redeem themselves by working for the government. Those under his command include the Big Man, Quickwire, Raptor and Normie Osborn.

Kaine appears to be genuinely interested in reformation, and has since been supportive of Spider-Girl and acted as an adviser.

Spider-Girl is clueless about their genetic relationship with Kaine, although Kaine hinted at it in their first encounter. It is implied that Darkdevil does know the truth, however, once commenting on Kaine's "twisted notions of simple concepts like family". It has been later revealed that Darkdevil indeed does know about Kaine's connection to his deceased father, going as far as to refer to Kaine as "Uncle Kaine". He, however, has not mentioned any of this to his cousin.

In the comic's final story-arc, and a replica of May Parker appears on the scene, a comment is made about trying to find out which one is the real May Parker to which Kaine comments "Are you saying clones aren't real?"

Spider-Man: Clone Saga
Kaine appears during the miniseries exploring the Clone Saga as it was originally conceived. He is working for both a shadowy figure and Jackal for unknown reasons and attacks Ben Reilly and Peter Parker when they first meet. After Jackal targets Mary Jane, Kaine leads them to Jackal's lair, only for all three to be captured. It is at this point that the two learn that Kaine is another Parker clone. When Kaine sees Gwen Stacy being cloned, he breaks all three free before burning the Mark of Kaine into Jackal's face and breaking his neck. When the building explodes, Kaine escapes, having stolen both Jackal's clone stabilizing agent and a second pod containing an unknown clone for his shadowy boss. The figure is later revealed to be Harry Osborn still alive, with the pod containing a clone of Norman Osborn. The duo have Doctor Octopus make a clone-stabilizing agent. Later, Kaine is shown obtaining the infant May Parker from Allison Mongrain for Harry. He begins having doubts over Harry's plans when he holds the baby. After more soul-searching, he finally convinces himself to defy Harry's orders and returns the baby to Mary Jane Watson before escaping.

Ultimate Marvel
The Ultimate Marvel version of Kaine is depicted as a misguided, disfigured clone of Spider-Man (Peter Parker). Created by ambitious mastermind Dr. Octopus (acting with the CIA's consent), Kaine possessed superhuman strength, reflexes, equilibrium and a spider-sense, and wears a tattered version of Ben Reilly's Spider-Man costume. He kidnaps Mary Jane Watson and attempts to give his captive superpowers (via OZ), triggering a transformation into a large red monster despite the Tarantula's efforts. While trying to prevent Mary Jane from being taken, Kaine is killed by Nick Fury's Spider Slayers.

In other media

Television
A variation of Kaine appears in the Ultimate Spider-Man three-part episode "The Spider-Slayers", voiced by Drake Bell. This version is an imperfect synthezoid Spider-Slayer created by Doctor Octopus using Spider-Man's DNA and Arnim Zola's technology who is highly resistant to damage, can reattach lost limbs, and absorb life energy from Spider-themed individuals or his own fellow synthezoids. He first emerges after Spider-Man and Spider-Woman find one of HYDRA's abandoned labs and they seemingly defeat him. However, Kaine reemerges at the Triskelion as a deformed, mutated monster to absorb the other synthezoids and become the Ultimate Spider-Slayer, only to be defeated by Agent Venom.
 Additionally, the Scarlet Spider's aggressive personality and costume are amalgamated with the series' version of Ben Reilly (voiced by Scott Porter).

Film
Kaine Parker / Scarlet Spider will appear in the upcoming film Spider-Man: Across the Spider-Verse as a member of Miguel O'Hara's Spider-Forces.

Video games
 Kaine Parker as the Scarlet Spider appears as an unlockable costume for Peter Parker / Spider-Man in The Amazing Spider-Man and The Amazing Spider-Man 2.
 Kaine Parker as the Scarlet Spider, the Tarantula, and the Other appear as separate playable characters in Spider-Man Unlimited.
 Kaine Parker as the Scarlet Spider appears as an unlockable costume for the titular character of Marvel's Spider-Man as part of "The Heist" DLC.

References

External links
 Kaine at Marvel.com
 Kaine at Marvel wikia
 
 Kaine's profile at Spiderfan.org
 The Clone Saga Timeline

Comics characters introduced in 1994
Fictional assassins in comics
Fictional characters from New York City
Fictional characters with superhuman durability or invulnerability
Fictional characters with superhuman senses
Fictional characters with precognition
Clone characters in comics
Fictional fugitives
Incarnations of Spider-Man
Marvel Comics 2
Marvel Comics characters who can move at superhuman speeds
Marvel Comics characters with accelerated healing
Marvel Comics characters with superhuman strength
Marvel Comics mutates
Marvel Comics superheroes
Marvel Comics supervillains